Cody Kunyk (born May 20, 1990) is a Canadian ice hockey forward currently under contract to Oulun Kärpät of the Liiga. He has formerly played with the Tampa Bay Lightning of the National Hockey League. (NHL)

Playing career
Kunyk played collegiate hockey for the Alaska Nanooks in the NCAA Men's Division I Western Collegiate Hockey Association (WCHA). In his senior year, Kunyk's outstanding play was rewarded when he was chosen as the WCHA Player of the Year and was named to the 2013–14 All-WCHA First Team.

On April 13, 2014, Kunyk made his NHL debut with the Tampa Bay Lightning in a 1–0 shootout win against the Washington Capitals.

As a free agent from the Lightning after the completion of his entry-level contract, Kunyk signed a one-year deal with German-based club, Grizzlys Wolfsburg of the DEL on August 18, 2015. After training and competing in four pre-season games with Wolfsburg, Kunyk was released from his contract unable to reach the expectations of play on September 6, 2015. Kunyk later signed with Danish club, Gentofte Stars of the Metal Ligaen for the 2015–16 season. Kunyk made an immediate impact with the Stars and in 27 games, placed second in team scoring with 13 goals and 29 points.

In the following off-season, Kunyk returned to North America as a free agent, securing a one-year AHL contract with the Utica Comets, an affiliate to the Vancouver Canucks on July 25, 2016. Kunyk responded to his return to the AHL with a career year offensively in posting 15 goals and 37 points in 61 games.

As a free agent, Kunyk opted to return overseas in signing a one-year deal with top flight Finnish club, SaiPa of the Liiga on September 5, 2017.

Following a lone season in the Kontinental Hockey League with Kazakh club, Barys Nur-Sultan, in 2021–22, Kunyk returned to former club, Oulun Kärpät of the Finnish Liiga on a one-year contract on July 20, 2022.

Career statistics

Awards and honours

References

External links 

1990 births
Living people
AHCA Division I men's ice hockey All-Americans
Alaska Aces (ECHL) players
Alaska Nanooks men's ice hockey players
Barys Nur-Sultan players
Canadian ice hockey centres
Canadian expatriate ice hockey players in Denmark
Canadian expatriate ice hockey players in Finland
Gentofte Stars players
HPK players
Ice hockey people from Alberta
Oulun Kärpät players
SaiPa players
Sherwood Park Crusaders players
Sportspeople from Sherwood Park
Syracuse Crunch players
Tampa Bay Lightning players
Undrafted National Hockey League players
Utica Comets players